Daboia is a genus of venomous vipers.

Species
The following four species are recognized as being valid:
Daboia mauritanica  – Moorish viper
Daboia palaestinae  – Palestine viper
Daboia russelii  – Russell's viper
Daboia siamensis  – eastern Russell's viper

In the future, more species may be added to Daboia. Obst (1983) reviewed the genus and suggested that it be extended to include Macrovipera lebetina, Daboia palaestinae, and M. xanthina. Groombridge (1980, 1986) united V. palaestinae and Daboia as a clade based on a number of shared apomorphies, including snout shape and head color pattern. Lenk et al. (2001) found support for this idea based on molecular evidence, suggesting that Daboia not only include V. palaestinae, but also D. mauritanica and M. deserti.

References

 
Snake genera
Taxa named by John Edward Gray